The Luxgen M7, previously the Luxgen7 MPV is a 7-passenger Taiwanese automobile produced by Luxgen beginning from 2009.

Overview
The vehicle was developed under Yulon's R&D center, HAITEC. It was officially shown to the public on 19 August 2009, and hit showrooms on 9/19/2009. The car is powered by a 2.2 L I-4 MEFI turbocharged engine developed by tuned by Delphi. The platform is derived from the Renault Espace. The 5-speed Manumatic transmission is supplied by Aisin. Pricing starts at NT$798,000 up to NT$1,068,000. ABS, EBD, BAS, and the Think+ Multi-purpose system(slightly different by trim level) are all standard equipment. The targeted competitor is the BYD Song Max. In 2014, the Luxgen7 MPV received a facelift and name change to Luxgen M7 to fit the new Luxgen naming theme.

The voice controlled Luxgen Think+ system (co-developed with HTC) combines the on-board Windows CE computer with the Electronic Stability Control system and it provides 3.5G mobile internet connection, GPS navigation, along with travel, shop, and traffic information.

A facelift was done in 2014 with a redesigned front bumper, dark head lamps with DRL, and a new set of LED tail lamps. The fuel efficiency was also improved to 13.57 km/L(EPA) and 11.8 km/L(EU).

In September 2021, Luxgen confirmed that the ICE-only powered M7 minivan will be discontinued from late this year due to poor sales and implementation of the Environmental Protection Administration's Phase 6 automotive emissions standards, as its engine is unable to be modified further to remain in compliance with the new automotive emission standards. This means that the Luxgen M7 will only be available with an all-electric powertrain as the sole powertrain choice for the M7.

EV+
Luxgen also introduced the world's first electric MPV, Luxgen7 MPV electric vehicle co-developed by AC Propulsion.
While most of the exterior was based on the regular Luxgen7 MPV, the EV+ receives a different front bumper and grille compartment design and clear tail lamp clusters in a lightly tinted blue color.

CEO
The Luxgen 7 CEO is an executive limousine built on the MPV platform. Most parts of the vehicle body remains the same while on the exterior, the CEO receives a different grille design. It has two "first-class" rear seats with massage, recline and leg rest. A divider with motorized panels separates the passenger and driver compartments. The glass window can be frosted with the flick of a switch, along with an opaque panel that enhances privacy.

V7 

The Luxgen V7 is Luxgen's wheelchair accessible van based on the M7. It is launched in 2016 and is equipped with an extended and lower tailgate and a raised roof.

References

M7
Front-wheel-drive vehicles
Cars introduced in 2009
Minivans
Vans
Production electric cars
Electric vans
2010s cars